Canadore College is a college of applied arts and technology located in North Bay, Ontario, Canada. It was founded in 1967 as a campus of Sudbury's Cambrian College, and became an independent institution in 1972. Canadore College has three campuses in North Bay, Ontario, and one campus in Parry Sound, Ontario. Canadore has a full-time enrollment of 3,500 students.

Programs
Canadore College offers more than 65 full-time post-secondary programs, focused in several key academic sectors: aviation technology; business and management; community justice and police studies; culinary arts; environmental studies and biotechnology; health, human care and wellness; indigenous studies; language, access and preparatory studies; media, design and dramatic arts; sport and recreation; and trades and technology.  Part-time studies in business; general interest; geographic information systems; health sciences; hospitality; information technology; languages; law and justice; preparatory studies; recreation and leisure services; trades and technology; and transportation are also offered in the traditional classroom and/or online.

Student life

Sport and Wellness

Canadore athletes (Panthers) compete at the OCAA (Ontario Colleges Athletic Association) varsity level in men's and women's volleyball, and men's basketball. The men's and women's hockey and men's and women's indoor soccer teams are at the extramural level. There are various other extracurricular opportunities as well. Canadore hosts many rec leagues, tournaments, and activity days.

Buildings and features
Canadore shares its main campus facilities with Nipissing University. Canadore College has four campuses: Aviation Technology Campus, Commerce Court Campus, and the Education Centre (College Drive Campus) in North Bay, Ontario, and one campus in West Parry Sound, Ontario, and three campuses in the GTA (Scarborough, Mississauga and Brampton) – Canadore at Stanford. 

In 2018, Canadore opened The Village, a new $20 million "health and wellness centre".

Residences

Canadore College offers apartment-style residences, also referred to as Lower Residence.

References

Colleges in Ontario
Educational institutions established in 1967
Education in North Bay, Ontario
Buildings and structures in Nipissing District
1967 establishments in Ontario